Silvanus is a traditional figure in Eastern Orthodox tradition assumed to be one of the Seventy Apostles, those followers of Jesus sent out by him in Luke 10. According to Orthodox tradition, he later became Bishop of Thessalonika and died a martyr. 

He is to be distinguished from the Silvanus, better known as Silas, who is mentioned in the New Testament (Acts, various letters of Paul, and 1 Peter) as a co-writer or transcriber of some of these works.

References

Seventy disciples
Saints of Roman Thessalonica
1st-century bishops in the Roman Empire
Biblical apostles
Christian saints from the New Testament
Bishops of Thessaloniki